Maureen Martin (née Reynolds) is a former England women's international footballer. Reynolds's greatest achievement was winning the Women's FA cup as the Norwich City coach.

International career

Maureen Reynolds represented England 4 times.

Honours
Norwich City
 FA Women's Cup: 1985–86

References

Living people
Lowestoft Ladies F.C. players
English women's footballers
England women's international footballers
Women's association football defenders
English women's football managers
Year of birth missing (living people)